67P/Churyumov–Gerasimenko (abbreviated as 67P or 67P/C–G) is a Jupiter-family comet, originally from the Kuiper belt, with a current orbital period of 6.45 years, a rotation period of approximately 12.4 hours and a maximum velocity of . It was first observed on photographic plates in 1969 by Soviet astronomers Klim Ivanovych Churyumov and Svetlana Ivanovna Gerasimenko, after whom it is named. It most recently came to perihelion (closest approach to the Sun) on 2 November 2021, and will next come to perihelion on 9 April 2028.

Churyumov–Gerasimenko was the destination of the European Space Agency's Rosetta mission, launched on 2 March 2004. Rosetta rendezvoused with Churyumov–Gerasimenko on 6 August 2014 and entered orbit on 10 September 2014. Rosetta lander, Philae, landed on the comet's surface on 12 November 2014, becoming the first spacecraft to land on a comet nucleus. On 30 September 2016, the Rosetta spacecraft ended its mission by landing on the comet in its Ma'at region.

Discovery 
Churyumov–Gerasimenko was discovered in 1969 by Klim Ivanovich Churyumov of the Kyiv University's Astronomical Observatory, who examined a photograph that had been exposed for comet Comas Solà by Svetlana Ivanovna Gerasimenko on 11 September 1969 at the Alma-Ata Astrophysical Institute, near Alma-Ata (now Almaty), the then-capital city of Kazakh Soviet Socialist Republic, Soviet Union. Churyumov found a cometary object near the edge of the plate, but assumed that this was comet Comas Solà.

After returning to his home institute in Kyiv, Churyumov examined all the photographic plates more closely. On 22 October, about a month after the photograph was taken, he discovered that the object could not be Comas Solà, because it was about 1.8 degrees off the expected position. Further scrutiny produced a faint image of Comas Solà at its expected position on the plate, thus proving the other object to be a different body.

Shape 

With each orbit the comet loses matter, as gas and dust are evaporated away by the Sun. The comet has a mass of approximately 10 billion tonnes.

The two-lobe shape of the comet is the result of a gentle, low-velocity collision of two objects, and is called a contact binary. The "terraces", layers of the interior of the comet that have been exposed by partial stripping of outer layers during its existence, are oriented in different directions in the two lobes, indicating that two objects fused to form Churyumov–Gerasimenko.

Surface 
[[File:67P Churyumov-Gerasimenko surface.gif|alt=A black and white short animation of dust on the surface|thumb|Dust and cosmic rays on the surface of the comet in 2016, with stars moving in the background. Filmed by Rosetta'''s OSIRIS instrument.]]

There are 26 distinct regions on Churyumov–Gerasimenko, with each named after an Egyptian deity; regions on the large lobe are named after gods, whereas those on the small lobe are named after goddesses. 19 regions were defined in the northern hemisphere prior to equinox. Later, when the southern hemisphere became illuminated, seven more regions were identified using the same naming convention.

 Gates 
Features described as gates, twin prominences on the surface so named for their appearance, were named after deceased members of the Rosetta team.

 Surface changes 
During Rosetta lifetime, many changes were observed on the comet's surface, particularly when the comet was close to perihelion. These changes included evolving patterns of circular shapes in smooth terrains that at some point grew in size by a few metres per day. A fracture in the neck region was also observed to grow in size; boulders tens of metres wide were displaced, sometimes travelling more than 100 metres; and patches of the ground were removed to expose new features. A number of collapsing cliffs have also been observed. One notable example in December 2015 was captured by Rosetta NAVCAM as a bright patch of light shining from the comet. Rosetta scientists determined that a large cliff had collapsed, making it the first landslide on a comet known to be associated with an outburst of activity. An apparent outburst of the comet was observed on 14 November 2021. According to the researchers, "At the time of the outburst discovery with ZTF, the comet was 1.23 au from the Sun and 0.42 au from the Earth. The comet's last perihelion passage was on 2021 Nov 2.".

 Cheops boulder 
Cheops is the largest boulder on the surface of the comet, measuring up to 45 meters. It is located in the comet's larger lobe. It was named for the pyramid in Giza because its shape is similar to that of a pyramid.

 Orbit and rotation 

Like the other comets of the Jupiter family, Churyumov–Gerasimenko probably originated in the Kuiper belt and was ejected towards the interior of the Solar System, where later encounters with Jupiter successively changed its orbit.

Before Churyumov–Gerasimenko's perihelion passage in 2009, its rotational period was 12.76 hours. During this perihelion passage, it decreased to 12.4 hours, which likely happened because of sublimation-induced torque.

 2015 perihelion 
, Churyumov–Gerasimenko's nucleus had an apparent magnitude of roughly 20. It came to perihelion on 13 August 2015. From December 2014 until September 2015, it had an elongation less than 45 degrees from the Sun. It crossed the celestial equator on 5 May 2015 and became easiest to see from the Northern Hemisphere. Even right after perihelion when it was in the constellation of Gemini, it only brightened to about apparent magnitude 12, and required a telescope to be seen. , the comet had a total magnitude of about 20.

 Rosetta mission 

The Rosetta mission was the first mission to include an orbiter that accompanied a comet for several years, as well as a lander that collected close-up data from the comet's surface. The mission launched in 2004, arrived at comet 67P in 2014, and concluded with a touchdown on the comet's surface in 2016.

 Advance work 

As preparation for the Rosetta mission, Hubble Space Telescope pictures taken on 12 March 2003 were closely analysed. An overall 3D model was constructed and computer-generated images were created.

On 25 April 2012, the most detailed observations until that time were taken with the 2-metre Faulkes Telescope by N. Howes, G. Sostero and E. Guido while it was at its aphelion.

On 14 July 2014, images taken by Rosetta showed that its nucleus is irregular in shape with two distinct lobes. The size of the nucleus was estimated to be . Two explanations for its shape were proposed at the time: that it was a contact binary, or that its shape may have resulted from asymmetric erosion due to ice sublimating from its surface to leave behind its lobed shape. By September 2015, mission scientists had determined that the contact binary hypothesis was unambiguously correct.

 Rendezvous and orbit 

Ground controllers rendezvoused Rosetta with Churyumov–Gerasimenko on 6 August 2014.

 Landing 

Descent of a small lander occurred on 12 November 2014. Philae is a  robotic probe that set down on the surface with landing gear. The landing site has been christened Agilkia in honor of Agilkia Island, where the temples of Philae Island were relocated after the construction of the Aswan Dam flooded the island. The acceleration due to gravity on the surface of Churyumov–Gerasimenko has been estimated for simulation purposes at 10−3 m/s, or about 1/10000 of that on Earth.

Because of its low relative mass, landing on the comet involved certain technical considerations to keep Philae anchored. The probe contains an array of mechanisms designed to manage Churyumov–Gerasimenko's low gravity, including a cold gas thruster, harpoons, landing-leg-mounted ice screws, and a flywheel to keep it oriented during its descent. During the event, the thruster and the harpoons failed to operate, and the ice screws did not gain a grip. The lander bounced twice and only came to rest when it made contact with the surface for the third time, two hours after first contact.

Contact with Philae was lost on 15 November 2014 because of dropping battery power. The European Space Operations Centre briefly reestablished communications on 14 June 2015 and reported a healthy spacecraft but communications were lost again soon after. On 2 September 2016, Philae was located in photographs taken by the Rosetta orbiter. It had come to rest in a crack with only its body and two legs visible. While the discovery solves the question of the lander's disposition, it also allows project scientists to properly contextualise the data it returned from the comet's surface.

 Physical properties 

The composition of water vapor from Churyumov–Gerasimenko, as determined by the Rosetta spacecraft, is substantially different from that found on Earth. The ratio of deuterium to hydrogen in the water from the comet was determined to be three times that found for terrestrial water. This makes it unlikely that water found on Earth came from comets such as Churyumov–Gerasimenko. The water vapor is also mixed with significant amount of formaldehyde (0.5 wt%) and methanol (0.4 wt%), these concentrations falling within common range for Solar system comets. On 22 January 2015, NASA reported that, between June and August 2014, the comet released increasing amounts of water vapor, up to tenfold as much. On 23 January 2015, the journal Science published a special issue of scientific studies related to the comet.

Beneath that is hard ice, or a mixture of ice and dust. Porosity appears to increase toward the center of the comet.

The nucleus of Churyumov–Gerasimenko was found to have no magnetic field of its own after measurements were taken during Philae descent and landing by its ROMAP instrument and Rosetta RPC-MAG instrument. This suggests that magnetism may not have played a role in the early formation of the Solar System, as had previously been hypothesized.

Also, active pits, related to sinkhole collapses and possibly associated with outbursts are present on the comet.

Measurements by the COSAC and Ptolemy instruments on the Philae lander revealed sixteen organic compounds, four of which were seen for the first time on a comet, including acetamide, acetone, methyl isocyanate and propionaldehyde. Astrobiologists Chandra Wickramasinghe and Max Wallis stated that some of the physical features detected on the comet's surface by Rosetta and Philae, such as its organic-rich crust, could be explained by the presence of extraterrestrial microorganisms. Rosetta program scientists dismissed the claim as "pure speculation". Carbon-rich compounds are common in the Solar System. Neither Rosetta nor Philae is equipped to search for direct evidence of organisms. The only amino acid detected thus far on the comet is glycine, along with precursor molecules methylamine and ethylamine.

Solid organic compounds were also found in the dust particles emitted by the comet; the carbon in this organic material is bound in "very large macromolecular compounds", analogous to the insoluble organic matter in carbonaceous chondrite meteorites. Scientists think that the observed cometary carbonaceous solid matter could have the same origin as the meteoritic insoluble organic matter, but suffered less modification before or after being incorporated into the comet.

One of the most outstanding discoveries of the mission so far is the detection of large amounts of free molecular oxygen gas surrounding the comet. Current solar system models suggest the molecular oxygen should have disappeared by the time 67P was created, about 4.6 billion years ago in a violent and hot process that would have caused the oxygen to react with hydrogen and form water. Molecular oxygen has never before been detected in cometary comas. In situ measurements indicate that the / ratio is isotropic in the coma and does not change systematically with heliocentric distance, suggesting that primordial  was incorporated into the nucleus during the comet's formation. This interpretation was challenged by the discovery that  may be produced on the surface of the comet in water molecule collisions with silicates and other oxygen-containing materials. Detection of molecular nitrogen in the comet suggests that its cometary grains formed in low-temperature conditions below .

On 3 July 2018, researchers hypothesized that molecular oxygen may not be made on the surface of comet 67P in sufficient quantity, thus deepening the mystery of its origin.

 Future missions 
CAESAR was a proposed sample-return mission aimed at returning to 67P/Churyumov–Gerasimenko, capturing regolith from the surface, and returning it to Earth. This mission was competing in NASA's New Frontiers mission 4 selection process, and was one of two finalists in the program. In June 2019, it was passed over in favor of Dragonfly.

 Gallery 

 See also 
 List of comets visited by spacecraft
 

 Notes 

 References 
 

 Further reading 
 
 

 External links 

 67P/Churyumov–Gerasimenko at Cometography
 67P/Churyumov–Gerasimenko by the Instituto de Astrofísica de Canarias
 67P/Churyumov–Gerasimenko pronunciation guide by ESA
 "Mission to Land on a Comet" by NASA
 
 Rosetta final images on YouTube, by ESA
 Rosetta complete image archive by ESA
 OSIRIS stereo views of 67P/Churyumov–Gerasimenko by CNES
 Landing News and Comments (The New York Times''; 12 November 2014)

19690920
Comets visited by spacecraft
Contact binary (small Solar System body)
Periodic comets
0067
067P
067P
Rosetta mission
Comets in 2014
Comets in 2015
20211102
Discoveries by Klim Churyumov
Discoveries by Svetlana Gerasimenko